Harley Herman Sadler (September 4, 1892 – October 14, 1954) was an American showman, oilman, and state legislator from Texas. He performed in tent shows.

He joined Roy E. Fox's troupe.

A Democrat, he served in the Texas House from 1943 to 1953 and in the Texas Senate in 1953 and 1954. Sadler died in office, and David Ratliff won a special election to succeed him.

References

1892 births
1954 deaths
Democratic Party Texas state senators
Democratic Party members of the Texas House of Representatives
20th-century American politicians